The 2014 Royal Guard Open was a men's tennis tournament played on clay courts. It was the 21st and last edition of the Royal Guard Open, and part of the ATP World Tour 250 series of the 2014 ATP World Tour. It took place in Viña del Mar, Chile from 3 February through 9 February 2014.

Singles main-draw entrants

Seeds 

 Rankings are as of January 27, 2014.

Other entrants 

The following players received wildcards into the singles main draw:
  Alexandr Dolgopolov
  Christian Garín
  Gonzalo Lama

The following players received entry from the qualifying draw:
  Martín Alund
  Thomaz Bellucci
  Taro Daniel 
  Rubén Ramírez Hidalgo

Withdrawals
Before the tournament
  Albert Montañés

Doubles main-draw entrants

Seeds 

 Rankings are as of January 27, 2014.

Other entrants 

The following pairs received wildcards into the doubles main draw:
  Christian Garín /  Nicolás Jarry
  Gonzalo Lama /  Juan Carlos Sáez

Finals

Singles 

  Fabio Fognini defeated  Leonardo Mayer 6–2, 6–4

Doubles 

  Oliver Marach /  Florin Mergea defeated  Juan Sebastián Cabal /  Robert Farah, 6–3, 6–4

References

External links 
 

Royal Guard Open
Chile Open (tennis)
Royal Guard Open